The Blankney Hunt is an English foxhound pack, based in the village of Blankney, Lincolnshire, with hunting country of around  by  within Lincolnshire and Nottinghamshire.

History and masters
The hunt dates from 1871, when the old Burton Hunt was divided; the "country" as now constituted has existed since the end of the nineteenth century.

The hounds were owned by a  Mr. Cockburn from 1896, before being sold to Edgar Lubbock in 1904. Lubbock  (1847–1907) was a lawyer who moved to nearby Caythorpe following his marriage in 1886 and after riding with both the Belvoir and Blankney Hunts, became Master of the Blankney in 1904. Following Lubbock's death, the hounds were sold to Lord Charles Bentinck who sold them on to Sir Robert Filmer in 1909. Vernon Willey, 2nd Baron Barnby (1884–1982), soldier and politician, was Master of the hunt in 1919 and 1933.

Description of country
The country covers the Lincoln Heath and is mainly arable country with stone walls and hedges. The country borders on the Belvoir Hunt to the east and the Burton Hunt to the north.

Related activities
The Blankney Hunt branch of the Pony Club was established in 1938.

There is an annual Point-to-point meeting associated with the hunt.

The hunt has given its name to a Hunt class destroyer, Blankney and to a LNER Class D49 locomotive, No.247 The Blankney.

References

External links
 Blankney Hunt photo archive
 Country Life picture library
 Boxing day 2012 in Sleaford (video)

1871 establishments in England
Sport in Lincolnshire
Fox hunts in the United Kingdom
Fox hunts in England